Acropolitis excelsa is a moth of the family Tortricidae. It is found in Australia.

External links
Acropolitis excelsa at tortricidae.com

Archipini
Moths described in 1910
Moths of Australia
Taxa named by Edward Meyrick